The 2013 Genting Highlands bus crash was the deadliest road accident to occur in Malaysia. 37 passengers were killed and 16 others were injured in the accident which took place near Chin Swee Temple, Genting Highlands, Pahang. It occurred on 21 August 2013 at 2:15 pm, when the bus carrying 53 passengers lost control as it was going down an incline and it plunged into a deep ravine at about 60 metres at the kilometre 3.5 of the Genting Sempah-Genting Highlands Highway. The bus driver, Lim Kok Ho died on the spot.

The point of crash was about 10m after an escape ramp directly in the path of the bus.

The independent review of the crash cited six contributing factors, including excessive speed and poor bus maintenance.

References

Genting Highlands bus crash
Genting Highlands Bus Crash, 2013
August 2013 events in Asia
Bus incidents in Malaysia
Genting Highlands